I Wanna Get Funky is the eighth studio album by Albert King, covering various blues tunes with heavy funk overtones, by Albert King, recorded in 1972 and released in 1974. With a rhythm section led by the Bar-Kays and horn arrangements by the Memphis Horns, it is considered by AllMusic as a "another very solid, early-'70s outing".

Artwork 
In the artwork, Albert King is seen smoking and playing the guitar.

Track listing
"I Wanna Get Funky" (Carl Smith) – 4:08
"Playing on Me" (Sir Mack Rice) – 3:25
"Walking the Back Streets and Crying" (Sandy Jones) – 6:28
"'Til My Back Ain't Got No Bone" (Eddie Floyd, Alvertis Isbell) – 7:32
"Flat Tire" (Henry Bush, Booker T. Jones, Albert King) – 4:43
"I Can't Hear Nothing But the Blues" (Henry Bush, Dave Clark) – 4:16
"Travelin' Man" (Albert King) – 2:52
"Crosscut Saw" (R.G. Ford) – 7:45
"That's What the Blues Is All About" (Bobby Patterson, Jerry Strickland) – 3:53

Personnel
 Albert King – electric guitar, vocals
 Donald Kinsey (name on album credits incorrectly spelled as "Donald Kenzie") – rhythm guitar
 Memphis Symphony Orchestra – strings
 The Memphis Horns – horns
 The Bar-Kays & The Movement – rhythm section
 Hot Buttered Soul, Henry Bush – backing vocals
Lester Snell - arrangements
Dale Warren - arrangement on "Walking the Back Streets and Crying"
Technical
Daryl Williams, Robert Jackson, William C. Brown III - engineer
Maldwin Hamlin - photography

References

External links 
 

1974 albums
Albert King albums
Albums produced by Allen Jones (record producer)
Stax Records albums